The 1982 Canadian Grand Prix was a Formula One motor race held at Circuit Gilles Villeneuve on 13 June 1982. It was the eighth race of the 1982 Formula One World Championship. This was the first Canadian Grand Prix to be held in June, the organisers having moved the race from the autumn to allow for warmer weather; it has been held in June ever since.

The 70-lap race was won by Nelson Piquet, driving a Brabham-BMW. It was the first Formula One victory for a BMW-engined car, but the only victory of the season for defending Drivers' Champion Piquet. Team-mate Riccardo Patrese finished second in an older Brabham-Ford, with John Watson third in a McLaren-Ford.

Death of Riccardo Paletti

The race was marred by the death of Italian driver Riccardo Paletti, in only his second F1 race start. At the start, the lights took an unusually long time to turn to green. During this time, Didier Pironi, who had the pole position, stalled the engine of his Ferrari. Pironi lifted his hand to signal the problem just as the lights switched to green, which was too late to abort the start. The other cars swerved across the track, trying to squeeze past Pironi's stationary car. Raul Boesel just clipped the back left of the Ferrari, spinning his March into the path of Eliseo Salazar and Jochen Mass. Salazar, Boesel and Mass suffered minor impacts but it looked as if everyone had passed the Ferrari without serious consequences. The Osella's nose was crushed in severely.

Due to the force of the severe impact, Paletti sustained heavy chest injuries and was lying unconscious in his car, wedged against the steering wheel. Didier Pironi and Sid Watkins, the FIA's head doctor, was on the scene to stabilise and assist Paletti. As Watkins climbed over the wreckage of the Osella, the petrol from the fuel tank ignited, enveloping the car in a wall of fire. When the fire was finally put out, the injured Paletti was without a pulse. It took the rescue workers 25 minutes to cut him out safely from his wrecked car, as the sparks caused by the cutting equipment threatened to re-ignite the petrol on the track. He was flown by a medical helicopter to the Royal Victoria Hospital, where he died soon after arriving. His mother was watching from the stands, as they were to celebrate his 24th birthday later that week. Paletti suffered a torn aorta as well as fractures to both legs. According to track doctor Jacques Bouchard his pupils were already dilated when medical personnel arrived and that the extended extraction time made no difference to his chances of survival.Paletti was the last driver to lose his life in a Formula One car until Elio de Angelis was killed while testing for Brabham at the Circuit Paul Ricard in France in 1986, and was the last fatality at a Formula One race weekend until Roland Ratzenberger at the 1994 San Marino Grand Prix.

Classification

Qualifying

Race

Championship standings after the race

Drivers' Championship standings

Constructors' Championship standings

References

Canadian Grand Prix
Grand Prix
Canadian Grand Prix
Canadian Grand Prix
Grand Prix